Tropical Storm Mangkhut, known in the Philippines as Tropical Depression Kiko, was a storm that made landfall in Vietnam during August 7 and 8, 2013. At least 3 people were killed, due to strong winds and flash floods. Mangkhut was the first storm to form during August and nearly had the same track as Tropical Storm Jebi a week prior.

Meteorological history

A broad low pressure area formed east of Mindanao, Philippines on August 3, after Jebi made landfall over northern Vietnam and dissipated.

Later that day as the system consolidated further the JMA reported that the depression had developed into a tropical storm and named it Mangkhut, before the JTWC initiated advisories and designated it as Tropical Depression 10W.

Over the next couple of days the system moved towards the north-northwest before it made landfall in Northern Vietnam during August 7. Later that day, it was said that 2 people died due to strong winds and falling debris. On August 8, Mangkhut was weakened to a tropical depression by the JMA, and JTWC later that day. Mangkhut was then last noted early the next day as it dissipated over Laos. During August 9, a total of 3 people were killed.

Impact

Vietnam
In the afternoon of August 7, a teenager named Pham Thanh Son (16 years old, resident of Dang Giang Ward, Ngo Quyen District) heard information about Mangkhut affecting Hai Phong, so he and his three friends took two motorbikes to go watch the storm. All 4 people stopped at the beach area in front of the Hai Yen hotel to watch the waves. Son ran along the embankment all by himself, and he was suddenly swept into the sea by the waves.

Tropical Storm Mangkhut weakened as it made landfall over Thanh Hóa Province and Ninh Bình Province delta late evening on 7 August. A peak gust of 30 m/s was recorded at Nam Dinh, and accumulated precipitation total during the time of Mangkhut over Southeast part of Vietnam was 336mm which was recorded at Ky Anh. A central pressure value of 992.2mb was also recorded at 15:20 UTC in Thanh Hoa city. Four persons were killed, five were injured due to the impact of Mangkhut.

Total damage in Vietnam reached 1.3 trillion dong (US$56.1 million).

See also

 Tropical Storm Koni
 Tropical Storm Kelly

References

External links

JMA General Information of Tropical Storm Mangkhut (1310) from Digital Typhoon
JMA Best Track Data of Tropical Storm Mangkhut (1310) 
JTWC Best Track Data of Tropical Storm 10W (Mangkhut)
10W.MANGKHUT from the U.S. Naval Research Laboratory

2013 Pacific typhoon season
2013 in Vietnam
Typhoons in Vietnam
2013 disasters in the Philippines
Typhoons in the Philippines
2013 disasters in China
Typhoons in China
Western Pacific tropical storms
Mangkhut